Jesús Antonio Vázquez Ocampo (born March 22, 1995) is an American professional soccer player who plays as a center-back for Indy Eleven in the USL Championship.

Club career
Vázquez was loaned to Indy Eleven on July 25, 2022 for the remainder of the 2022 USL Championship season. Indy sent midfielder Jonas Fjeldberg in return. On August 18, 2022, Indy Eleven opted to make his deal at the club permanent and signed him to a new contract.

References

External links
 
 LA Galaxy II profile

1995 births
Living people
American soccer players
Association football defenders
Atlante F.C. footballers
Pioneros de Cancún footballers
Ascenso MX players
Liga Premier de México players
Soccer players from California
American sportspeople of Mexican descent
LA Galaxy II players
USL Championship players
People from San Luis Obispo, California
Rio Grande Valley FC Toros players
Indy Eleven players